Clube do Chibuto, or simply Chibuto, is a Mozambique multi sports club from Chibuto especially known for its football.

Clube do Chibuto was founded on 29 September 1949.

The team plays in Moçambola.

Stadium
Currently the team plays at the 2,000 capacity Campo do Chibuto.

References

External links

Soccerway

Football clubs in Mozambique